is a 2013 German film directed by Til Schweiger.  It is a sequel to the 2011 film . It was released in German-speaking countries (Germany, Austria and Switzerland) on 7 February 2013. The film stars Til Schweiger, his daughter Emma Schweiger, Jasmin Gerat and Samuel Finzi reprising their roles from the first film.

Plot 
Two years have passed since Henry, Katharina, Tristan and Magdalena became a family. Just when they think that everything has returned to normal, chaos breaks out. Henry begins a career as a film producer; for his first project, he must work with eccentric young actor Matthias Schweighöfer. Meanwhile, Katharina is struggling with her role as a housewife and mother to baby Louis. In an attempt to save her marriage and rediscover herself, she moves into her own apartment. When Charlotte accepts a job abroad, Tristan faces a midlife crisis in the form of a young new girlfriend, Anna.  He moves in with Henry, and  the pair quickly become overwhelmed at the prospect of full responsibility for Louis and Magdalena. They decide to hire an attractive live-in nanny to help them out, which threatens Henry's possibility at a second chance with Katharina.  During all of this, Magdalena develops romantic interest in a boy for the first time.

Cast 
 Til Schweiger as Henry
 Matthias Schweighöfer as himself
 Emma Schweiger as Magdalena
 Jasmin Gerat as Katharina
 Samuel Finzi as Tristan
 Maurizio Magno as Nick
 Nico Liersch as Max
 Julia Jentsch as Mother Max
 Anna-Katharina Samsel as Nanny

Reception 
Ronny Dombrowski from Cinetastic gave the film a 6 out of a possible 10, with much praise to Emma Schweiger for being the "secret star" of the movie.

Trivia 
The movie title stands for Coq au vin, the only meal that Henry can cook.
Til Schweiger chose the song "Hall of Fame" by the Irish rock band The Script (featuring will.i.am) for the title song of the movie. The film music comes from the Finnish post-hardcore band Disco Ensemble.
The shooting of the movie was to take place from 2 August 2012 to 1 October 2012. The movie was shot in Berlin and Brandenburg.

References

External links 
 

2013 films
2013 comedy films
German comedy films
2010s German-language films
Films directed by Til Schweiger
Films scored by Martin Todsharow
Films set in Berlin
Films about filmmaking
Warner Bros. films
2010s German films